Palandöken Ice Skating Hall, formerly GSIM Yenişehir Ice Hockey Hall or Erzurum Ice Skating Hall, is an indoor ice skating and ice hockey rink located at Ahmet Baba neighborhood of Palandöken district in Erzurum, eastern Turkey. It was opened in 2008.

Owned by the Youth and Sport Directorate of Erzurum Province (GSIM), the venue has a seating capacity of 2,000 spectators. The rink hosts also figure skating and short track speed skating events in addition to ice hockey games.

International events hosted
11th World Ice Hockey U18 Championships-Division III – Group B Tournament – March 9–15, 2009.
12th World Ice Hockey U18 Championships-Division III – Group A Tournament – March 8–14, 2010.
25th Winter Universiade – Figure skating – February 1–5, 2011.
2017 European Youth Olympic Winter Festival – February 12–17, 2017

See also
 Erzurum GSIM Ice Arena

References

Indoor arenas in Turkey
Ice hockey venues in Turkey
Yenisehir
Sports venues completed in 2008
Figure skating in Turkey
Speed skating in Turkey